Andy Chiodo (born April 25, 1983) is a Canadian former professional ice hockey goaltender. Chiodo played eight games in the National Hockey League (NHL) with the Pittsburgh Penguins during the 2003–04 NHL season, for whom he is presently a goaltending coach.

Playing career 
Chiodo was originally selected by the New York Islanders in the sixth round (166th overall) of the 2001 NHL Entry Draft. The Islanders were unable to sign him, and he was made draft-eligible again after the 2002–03 NHL season. The Pittsburgh Penguins chose him in 2003 NHL Entry Draft in the seventh round with the 199th overall pick.

Prior to playing in the Ontario Hockey League, Chiodo played with the Wexford Raiders of the Ontario Provincial Junior A Hockey League. After playing three seasons in the Ontario Hockey League with the Toronto St. Michael's Majors, Chiodo made his professional debut with Pittsburgh's AHL affiliate, the Wilkes-Barre/Scranton Penguins, in the 2003–04 season. He also appeared in eight NHL games with Pittsburgh that season.

Chiodo has spent most of his professional career with Wilkes-Barre/Scranton and with Pittsburgh's ECHL affiliate, the Wheeling Nailers. He signed with Kärpät in the Finnish SM-liiga for the 2006–07 season, but was sidelined with an injury for most of the autumn. Kärpät released Chiodo from his contract in November, and he signed with Jokerit for a one-month tryout, making his SM-liiga debut on November 16 against HIFK. After only two games, he was injured again. At the SM-liiga trade deadline in January, he signed with HPK.

On August 20, 2009, he was signed by the Ottawa Senators to a one-year, two-way contract. He split time between Ottawa's AHL affiliate in Binghamton and their ECHL affiliate in Elmira. After the completion of the 2009–10 NHL season, Chiodo was not offered a new contract and became an unrestricted free agent.

Chiodo returned to Europe in signing with EC KAC for the 2010–11 EBEL season. He played in 30 games with the team and had a league-best 2.60 GAA. Chiodo led EC KAC to the 2010–11 EBHL Finals before losing to Red Bull Salzburg four games to three. On April 14, 2011 Chiodo re-signed on a two-year contract extension with Klagenfurt.

On November 7, 2013, the Bakersfield Condors of the ECHL signed Chiodo for the 2013–14 season. After just four games with the Condors, Chiodo opted to terminate his contract and returned to the Finnish Liiga with Tappara.

On August 14, 2014, Chiodo returned to the Austrian EBEL, in signing a one-year contract with Slovenian club, HDD Olimpija Ljubljana. In the 2014–15 season, Chiodo appeared in 39 games as Ljulbjana's starting goaltender, for 14 wins. With the club out of playoff contention, on January 28, 2015, Chiodo left to play for the remainder of the season in the Finnish Liiga with KalPa.

On April 5, 2015, Chiodo as a free agent, signed with his third EBEL club, on a one-year deal with HC TWK Innsbruck.

Coaching career
Chiodo began a post-playing career as a goaltending coach by joining the Ottawa 67's of the Ontario Hockey League in 2017. He then made a return to the Pittsburgh Penguins organization when he was hired to serve as goaltending development coach in June of 2018, where he coached the Penguins prospect goaltenders in the minor leagues. He was promoted to the team's NHL goaltending coach in 2021.

Career statistics

Regular season

References

External links

1983 births
Living people
Canadian people of Italian descent
Bakersfield Condors (1998–2015) players
Binghamton Senators players
Canadian expatriate sportspeople in Russia
Canadian ice hockey goaltenders
Elmira Jackals (ECHL) players
HC Dinamo Minsk players
HC TWK Innsbruck players
HDD Olimpija Ljubljana players
HPK players
Ice hockey people from Toronto
Jokerit players
KalPa players
Oulun Kärpät players
EC KAC players
New York Islanders draft picks
Pittsburgh Penguins draft picks
Pittsburgh Penguins players
Pittsburgh Penguins coaches
Tappara players
Toronto St. Michael's Majors players
Wilkes-Barre/Scranton Penguins players
Wheeling Nailers players
Canadian expatriate ice hockey players in Austria
Canadian expatriate ice hockey players in Slovenia
Canadian expatriate ice hockey players in Belarus
Canadian expatriate ice hockey players in Finland
Canadian expatriate ice hockey players in the United States